Ajab Shir (also Romanized as ‘Ajab Shīr; also known as Ajabshahr) is a city in the Central District of Ajab Shir County, East Azerbaijan province, Iran, and serves as capital of the county. At the 2006 census, its population was 26,235 in 6,767 households. The following census in 2011 counted 26,280 people in 7,758 households. The latest census in 2016 showed a population of 33,606 people in 10,640 households. The city's population is Azerbaijani.

References 

Ajab Shir County

Cities in East Azerbaijan Province

Populated places in East Azerbaijan Province

Populated places in Ajab Shir County